Vivek Anand Oberoi (born 3 September 1976) is an Indian actor who mainly works in Hindi cinema, in addition to working in few Telugu, Malayalam, Kannada and Tamil films.

Early life 
Vivek Oberoi was born in Hyderabad, Telangana, to a Punjabi father, Suresh Oberoi, an actor. In 1974, Suresh married Yashodhara, from a Punjabi business family settled in the south, in Chennai. Because of his mother’s family being assimilated in the region, Oberoi is himself fluent in Tamil. 

Oberoi went on to study at Mayo College, Ajmer and Mithibai College, Mumbai. At an actors' workshop in London, he was spotted by the director of New York University who took Oberoi to New York, where he completed his master's degree in film acting.

Career

2002–2009 
Oberoi made his debut with Ram Gopal Varma's film Company. It received commercial and critical success. Jyoti Shukla of Rediff.com called it a "fast-paced movie" that is "anchored by brilliant performances." She praised the performances of Mohanlal, Ajay Devgn, and Oberoi, and said they are "a treat to watch." Derek Elley of Variety wrote: "By Bollywood standards, a dark and realistic look at the Mumbai underworld through the battle between a powerful don and his vengeful former sidekick, Company manages to cater to Hindi cinema norms while feeding the viewer something a little different." In 2010, Raja Sen wrote in his review: "This finely plotted duel between two gangsters left us battered, bruised and craving more".

Oberoi then starred in the action films Road and Dum.

In 2002, he starred in the romantic drama Saathiya, directed by Shaad Ali. The film was a success at the box office and earned him a Filmfare nomination in the Best Actor category.

In 2004, he starred in the comedy Masti and political thriller Yuva. Both were commercial and critical successes. In 2005, he played the title character in Kisna: The Warrior Poet.

In 2006, Oberoi appeared in Omkara, an adaptation of Shakespeare's play Othello, playing the character of Kesu, based on the character Michael Cassio in the original play. After seeing Oberoi's performance, Gulzar congratulated him.

In 2007, Oberoi played the gangster Maya Dolas in Shootout at Lokhandwala. 

In 2008, Oberoi starred in Mission Istanbul, directed by Apoorva Lakhia and produced by Ekta Kapoor. He performed to the song Apun Ke Saath, produced for the film by Vikas Kohli, at the 2008 International Indian Film Academy Awards. It received negative reviews from critics. Bollywood Hungama critic Taran Adarsh gave it 1.5 out of 5 stars. The Hindu stated that Mission Istaanbul has no sting. Rediff.com gave it 1 star.

In 2009, Oberoi starred with Kareena Kapoor and Saif Ali Khan in Kurbaan, directed by Rensil D'Silva and produced by Dharma Productions. It received positive reviews from critics, with praise for its direction, screenplay, soundtrack, and performances of the cast, with particular praise directed towards Kapoor's performance. However, despite critical acclaim, it was declared a flop by Box Office India

2010–2019 

In 2010, Oberoi appeared in Prince, which failed to receive a good response from the audience, despite initial box office success. Taran Adarsh of Bollywood Hungama rated it 3 out of 5, saying "Prince has all merits to strike a chord with the youth", praising Oberoi's 'bravura' performance, the film's 'Hollywood style' look and action sequences, as well as the music. Noyon Jyoti Parasara of AOL India gave 3 out of 5, saying, "once you are willing to let go off your beliefs and logic – like you really can't jump off a cliff on your bike and remain unscratched – you would like the film." On the other hand, Omar Qureshi of Zoom rated Prince 2.5 out of 5, saying, "The film is over the top and unrealistic." Indiatimes.com rated it 2 out of 5 stars saying, "The film has taken the audience for granted, which shows us gadgets hard to believe and futuristic and that such futuristic shows should be limited to Hollywood.". Subhash K. Jha gave 2 out of 5 stars, and said, "Prince wears its super-cool shirt with the slogan 'Come Watch Me' with a little bit too much aggression. But if you love popcorn crunching adventure stories watch Vivek Oberoi play the hero from the hemisphere of hijinks." He praised Oberoi's acting and the action sequences, saying that "To his credit, Oberoi carries off the ceaseless stint with the stunt with arresting aplomb[...]The expertly-executed stunts frequently see our hero jumping down high-rise buildings in breathtaking leaps of fate, with the camera pulling back in respectful awe."

In the same year, he appeared in Ram Gopal Varma's Rakht Charitra playing the role of the Telugu politician Paritala Ravi. Oberoi's performance in the role of Paritala Ravi drew widespread praise, while Abhimanyu Singh's devious turn as Bukka Reddy, modelled on the real-life Obul Reddy, was regarded as one of the most terrifying villainous acts captured on celluloid in a long time. Renuka Rao of DNA India gave the movie 4 stars in a scale of 5, concluding that  RGV has surprisingly thrown at the audience a film that could actually evoke some emotions in you. A must, must watch." Taran Adarsh of Bollywood Hungama gave the movie 4 stars in a scale of 5, saying that "On the whole, RAKHT CHARITRA is not for the faint-hearted or the lily-livered. The violence, the blood and gore depicted in the film will shock and disconcert you, which only goes to establish as to how proficiently the subject material has been treated." Nikhat Kazmi of Times of India gave the movie 3 stars out of 5, stating that "Rakta Charitra holds up a brutal mirror on the muck that masquerades as democracy in India." Rajeev Masand of CNN-IBN gave the movie 3 out of 5 stars, noting that "Rakta Charitra is a bold, disturbing film that’s bursting with the kind of confidence we haven’t seen from the filmmaker recently. If the sight of blood doesn’t make you uncomfortable, chances are you’ll enjoy this film."

Oberoi produced a film named Dekh Indian Circus in 2011. The film was featured in the 16th Busan Film festival, winning the Audience Choice Award for Best Film from 3000 films worldwide and amongst 380 films screened. In 16 years of the history of Busan, this is the First Indian Film to win the award. The film has already received rave reviews from international critics and reporters from The Hollywood Reporter, Variety and Screen International. The film received overwhelmingly positive reviews from the critics. Richard Kuipers of Variety praised it for "bringing the themes of inequality and class divisions together in the highly entertaining visit to the big top." Kirk Honeycutt in his review for The Hollywood Reporter, praised director Mangesh Hadawale for portraying third-world issues through a family comedy that contains a stinging satire of contemporary India and its rampant corruption.

Oberoi's film Kismat Love Paisa Dilli, which was released in October 2012, failed to impress the audience and was a box office failure.

He also played supervillan Kaal in Krrish 3 (2013). Critics directed praise towards cast performances (particularly Hrithik Roshan, Kangana Ranaut and Oberoi), VFX, cinematography, background score, direction and entertainment value, but criticism has been directed towards the film's lack of originality, soundtrack and writing. Taran Adarsh of Bollywood Hungama gave the film 4.5 out of 5 stars and stated that "the film has all the ingredients that make a splendid superhero film, besides being Rakesh Roshan's most accomplished work so far." Madhureeta Mukherjee of The Times of India gave it 4.5 stars while commenting "For sheer vision, bravado and superlative execution, this one soars to new orbits. Latch on to this cape for an exhilarating ride." Raedita Tandan of Filmfare awarded it 4 out of 5 stars, remarking "Hats off to Rakesh Roshan for dreaming big and actually pulling off this risky proposition. It's not perfect. But it has all the elements a good, entertaining film must have. All you Marvel superheroes, better watch out. Krrish is here to stay." Anupama Chopra of the Hindustan Times gave it 3.5 stars and said, "Filmmaker Rakesh Roshan deserves a round of applause for giving us a homegrown superhero. Krrish 3 is ambitious and exciting." Sarita Tanwar of DNA gave it 3.5 stars and wrote, "Krrish 3 is fast-paced and the VFX effects are smashing." Rohit Khilnani of India Today gave it 3.5 stars noting, "The only part where the movie dips are during the songs. The music sounds too dated for this action-packed film."

Oberoi dubbed the voice of Electro in the Hindi-dubbed version of The Amazing Spider-Man 2, which was released in May 2014. 

In 2017, Oberoi made his Tamil debut in supporting role alongside Ajith Kumar in action thriller film Vivegam. The film received mixed reviews from critics. The Times of India rated the film 3 out of 5 and said "Vivegam is an over-the-top but engaging action thriller with a calculated mix of brawn and brain, action and sentiment, smartly pandering to fans while giving families something to connect with." NDTV rated the film 2.5 out of 5 stars and cited "Ajith Is Charismatic But Let Down By Silly Scenes". Behindwoods rated the film 2.25 out of 5, stating, "Vivegam – High on production value and action. Heavily dependent on Ajith's persona, engagement factor takes a beating". Mirchi9 gave the film 2 out of 5 stars, saying "Overall, Vivekam is for the fans and fans alone for whom just watching the star on screen is enough. There is ample style and punch dialogues with a healthy dose of action. For everyone else, it is an utterly boring film". Nowrunning rated the film 1.5/5 and said "Director Siva had collected a bunch of Spy movies from Hollywood and made a mashup of them. He picked up all the action blocks and combined it with loud background score which will only irk the audience. Even the action is also missing in the second half and there is no logic at all. The climax is stretched further which disappoints the audience".

Oberoi worked with YRF banner's film Bank Chor, with Rhea Chakraborty and Riteish Deshmukh.

He also appeared in Ram Charan starrer Telugu film Vinaya Vidheya Rama (2019), It received negative reviews from critics and became a box-office bomb, which prompted Charan to issue an apology letter. The Indian Express gave 1 out of 5 stars stating "Vinaya Vidheya Rama is like watching a Balakrishna action film on steroids. Clumsy and unconvincing screenplay". The New Indian Express gave 1.5 out of 5 stars stating "If there is a plot and a story that is worth a notice, then it is lost between all the fights, songs, dances and random elevation dialogues". Hindustan Times gave 0.5 out of 5 stars stating "The film itself feels dated. It is a mess that even Ram Charan – with all the weird stunts -- cannot punch his way out of". Firstpost gave 1.5 out of 5 stars stating "Realism has absolutely no place in the world of Vinaya Vidheya Rama".

In 2019, Oberoi made his Malayalam debut with Mohanlal in Prithviraj Sukumaran's directorial debut, Lucifer, as the main antagonist, Bobby, in which his performance as a villain was well received by critics and the audience. Times of India gave the film 3.5 out of 5 writing "Lucifer is a 'mass entertainer’ that is sure to please the fans and has enough going for to make it an engaging thriller as well. And apart from the mandatory Stan Lee, correction, Antony Perumbavoor cameo, watch out for Stephen's second avatar in the film."

He has featured as a talent judge for three seasons of the reality show India's Best Dramebaaz.  He portrayed the role of India's Prime Minister Narendra Modi in PM Narendra Modi. The film was universally panned by critics, who termed it a hagiography and criticized Oberoi's performance. Renuka Vyavahare of The Times of India gave the film two and a half stars out of five and criticised the script, opining, "This one is too lopsided for you to appreciate. It leaves a lot unanswered. While it firmly believes ‘Modi ek insaan nahi, soch hai’, we wish the script was as thoughtful". However, she was among the few who appreciated Oberoi's performance- "He gets the mannerisms, accent and tone right and thankfully doesn't overdo it". Writing for The Indian Express, Shubhra Gupta gave the movie two stars out of five and stated, "The film is not a mere bio-pic, it is a full-fledged, unabashed, unapologetic hagiography". Kennith Rosario of The Hindu summarised the movie's narrative as "a obsequious love letter" to the protagonist which tells the audience "how sincere, hardworking, fair and honest Modi is, [and] that it makes you wonder if life is a parody of this film".

2022-present
In 2022, he starred in Malayalam language film Kaduva opposite Prithviraj Sukumaran. Despite receiving mixed reviews, it was a commercial success. Sajin Shrijith of The New Indian Express rated 3.5 out of 5 and stated "We need to see the bad guys do something that would provoke our ire so that when, finally, the hero returns for payback, we take delight in every punch that lands. Thankfully, Kaduva follows this philosophy to a T, and I had quite a blast." Arjun Menon of Pinkvilla rated the film to be 3.5 out of 5 stars stating that "However, the film is a made-for-theatre watch, aided by a splendidly enjoyable background score from Jakes Bejoy and the thunderous frames that elevate the commonplace plot to new heights of first-rate commercial filmmaking that is meant to be experienced with a bunch of strangers in a dark room. Yes, Kaduva might have just saved Malayalam cinema for all we know or set off a new focus on narrating larger-than-life tales with the grounded, economy of new-age storytelling. Cris of The News Minute gave the film 3.5 out of 5 stars and stated that "The film starts and ends in the middle of nowhere, extracting a slice of Kuriachan's life. You do get to taste a bit of nostalgia in seeing land phones, Doordarshan's intro theme and a single television reporter in front of the CM. But the rest of the film is just a nicely edited long and unexciting script." Anna Mathews of The Times of India rated the film 3 out of 5 and wrote "If you are in the mood for a Prithviraj mass thriller, you might enjoy the movie, but don't expect to be wow-ed."He also starred in a short film, Versus of War.

He then starred in MX Player series Dharavi Bank alongside Suniel Shetty. It received praise from critics and audience for the performances and occasional criticism for writing. Saibal Chatterjee for NDTV gave 2/5 stars and wrote "Dharavi Bank sorely lacks the sort of narrative reserves that can fuel a compelling thriller." Abhimanyu Mathur for Hindustan Times wrote "Dharavi Bank will appeal to some, the ones who like the old-fashioned gangster dramas with over-the-top action. But the show is too old-fashioned and not in a classic way." Archika Khurana for The Times of India gave 3/5 rating and wrote "Suniel Shetty outshines everyone in his OTT debut as the brutal and vivacious gang lord of Dharavi. Right from his serious gaze to the protectiveness of his family and his wearing of the crisp white Mundu, Anna proves to be a perfect fit for the role of Thalavian." Manik Sharma for Firstpost wrote "The plotline, as a whole, moves with the steady but ultimately predictable pace of a Gangster v Police war where betrayals, rats and spies abound."

Personal life 
Oberoi's full first name, Vivekanand, is based on that of the Hindu monk Swami Vivekananda; his father and grandfathers were followers of the monk. He says he dropped Anand when he joined movies out of respect for Vivekananda, as he considered it would be embarrassing romancing and dancing on screen with the name of the monk.

He credits Kareena Kapoor as his inspiration for adopting a vegetarian diet.

Relationships and family
Oberoi dated his Kyun! Ho Gaya Na... co-star Aishwarya Rai. In 2003, Oberoi claimed that Rai's former boyfriend, Salman Khan, had threatened him. In 2005, Oberoi and Rai broke up.

On 29 October 2010, Oberoi married Priyanka Alva, daughter of Karnataka minister Jeevaraj Alva, in Bangalore. The couple have a son and a daughter.

Philanthropy
Oberoi's company, Karrm Infrastructure Pvt Ltd., has donated 25 flats in the Thane district of Maharashtra to the families of Central Reserve Police Force officers killed in action. In all, Oberoi has donated about  3 million and helped raise  25 million.

In 2021, he donated Rs 25 lakh to the fund created to overcome the shortage of oxygen cylinders in hospitals.

Filmography

Accolades

References

External links 

1976 births
Living people
20th-century Indian philanthropists
Indian male film actors
Indian male voice actors
Male actors in Hindi cinema
Male actors in Tamil cinema
Indian Hindus
Punjabi people
Male actors from Hyderabad, India
Mithibai College alumni
New York University alumni
International Indian Film Academy Awards winners
Filmfare Awards winners
Screen Awards winners
Zee Cine Awards winners